The Bolivian tree snake (Dipsas turgida) is a non-venomous snake found in Paraguay, Uruguay, Bolivia, and Brazi.

References

Dipsas
Snakes of South America
Reptiles of Paraguay
Reptiles of Uruguay
Reptiles of Bolivia
Reptiles of Brazil
Reptiles described in 1868
Taxa named by Edward Drinker Cope